, known in Japan as , is a surfing video game developed by Opus and published by ASCII Entertainment in Japan and Rockstar Games internationally for the PlayStation 2.

Gameplay 
There are two play modes that can be chosen from the main menu: Tournament which contains a collection of levels with different conditions, and Vs. Mode that is designed as same as the Tournament, only for two players. The latter is not played simultaneously but the players will alternate their turns instead. The goal is to travel through the waves that are moving in a certain direction while picking up the buoys scattered around and doing specific tricks, before the time limit expires. Each course requires the players to collect a certain number of points before progressing to the next one. They can be obtained by collecting markers or performing tricks.

In the Tournament mode, each series consists of six stages. Once a single series is completed, the next competition starts with the same amount of levels and with progressively more difficult conditions. At the beginning, only two difficulty levels are unlocked, easy and intermediate. As each of these are completed, new ones are opening, such as pro or semi pro. The players can choose from eleven different characters, like Kelly Sunset or Mark Mavericks. Each of them have slightly different stats.

Development 
 is a reworked version of Surfroid. As a result, the plot that revolved around aliens and the planetary doomsday was cut off from this version.

Reception 

The game received "generally unfavorable reviews" according to the review aggregation website Metacritic. Daniel Erickson of Next Generation said that the game was "One cute gimmick away from absolute crap." In Japan, Famitsu gave it a score of 30 out of 40.

References

External links 
 

2000 video games
Rockstar Games games
PlayStation 2 games
PlayStation 2-only games
Surfing video games
Video games developed in Japan